Nick Fransman (born 28 February 1992) is a Dutch badminton player. Plays for BC Smashing in Wijchen, he won the 2009 national junior titles in singles, men's doubles and mixed doubles. Fransman represented his country compete at the 2010 Summer Youth Olympics. He was runner-up at the National Championships in 2015, 2017 and 2018.

Achievements

BWF International Challenge/Series 
Men's singles

  BWF International Challenge tournament
  BWF International Series tournament
  BWF Future Series tournament

References

External links 
 
 

1992 births
Living people
Sportspeople from Arnhem
Dutch male badminton players
Badminton players at the 2010 Summer Youth Olympics
21st-century Dutch people